Aisne is a French department in the Hauts-de-France region of northern France. It is named after the river Aisne. In 2019, it had a population of 531,345.

Geography 

The department borders Nord (to the north), Somme and Oise (to the west), Ardennes and Marne (east), and Seine-et-Marne (south-west) and Belgium (Province of Hainaut) (to the north-east). The river Aisne crosses the area from east to west, where it joins the Oise. The Marne forms part of the southern boundary of the department with the department of Seine-et-Marne. The southern part of the department is the geographical region known as la Brie poilleuse, a drier plateau known for its dairy products and Brie cheese.

According to the 2003 census, the forested area of the department was 123,392 hectares, or 16.6% for an average metropolitan area of 27.4%.

The landscape is dominated by masses of rock which often have steep flanks. These rocks appear all over the region, but the most impressive examples are at Laon and the Chemin des Dames ridge.

Principal towns

The department of Aisne includes one medium-sized city (Saint-Quentin) and three small cities (Laon, Soissons and Château-Thierry) to which may be added the conglomeration formed by Chauny and Tergnier. There are many other agglomerations of an urban character because Aisne has been densely populated since before the 19th century. The villages are numerous and rather small. The most populous commune is Saint-Quentin; the prefecture Laon is the third-most populous. As of 2019, there are 7 communes with more than 10,000 inhabitants:

See also: List of the communes of the Aisne department.

Hydrography

The Scheldt (which takes its source near Le Catelet), the Aisne, the Marne, the Ourcq, the Vesle, the Somme (which rises in Fonsommes), the Oise, and the Serre. In the south of the department, there is the Surmelin, the Verdonnelle, and the Dhuys (this river is channeled into the Dhuis Aqueduct, 131 km long, to supply drinking water to Paris since 1 October 1865 and also more recently the Leisure Park of Marne-la-Vallée).

The department is also crossed by numerous canals (e.g. the Canal of Saint-Quentin, 93 km).

Railways
The department is crossed by three railway lines from Paris: the first two from the Gare du Nord and the third from the Gare de l'Est:
 the line from Paris to Maubeuge, serving cities including Chauny, Tergnier and Saint-Quentin
 the line from Paris to Laon, serving cities including Soissons, Anizy-le-Château, and Laon (prefecture)
 the line from Paris to Strasbourg, serving the city of Château-Thierry.

In 1873, the department of Aisne had 10 railway companies with a total length of 382 km.

Climate
There is an average of 500 to 750 mm precipitation annually.

Weather Data for Saint Quentin – Roupy

History 

Aisne developed from the ancient settlement of Acinum, from which its name derives. The Battle of the Axona was fought nearby in 57 BC.

Aisne is one of the original 83 departments created during the French Revolution on 4 March 1790. It was created from parts of the former provinces of Île-de-France (Laon, Soissons, Noyon, and Valois, which are actually historical and cultural parts of Picardy that were annexed to Île-de-France), Picardy (Thiérache Vermandois), and Champagne (Brie, and Omois).

Most of the old growth forests in the area were destroyed during battles in World War I. The French offensive against the Chemin des Dames in spring 1917 is sometimes referred to as the Second Battle of the Aisne.

Heraldry

Economy 
Agriculture dominates the economy, especially cereal crops. Beet sugar is one of the most important industrial crops of the area. Silk, cotton, and wool weaving flourish in Saint-Quentin and other towns. Saint-Gobain is known for its production of mirrors, which started in the 17th century. Guise is the agricultural centre of the northern area of Aisne. Volkswagen Group France has headquarters in Villers-Cotterêts.

Politics
The department is a mixture of rural areas and working-class towns. As a place of residence for some families working in Paris or Île-de-France, Aisne was for many years a department rather oriented to the left, with a majority on the General Council on the left since 1998, and the same for the majority of parliamentary seats representing the department in the National Assembly.

The smaller cities of the northern department such as Guise, Hirson, Vervins and the railway city of Tergnier are sources of support for left-wing parties.

Departmental Council 

The President of the General Council is the Liberal Nicolas Fricoteaux. In the 2021 departmental election, the Departmental Council of Aisne was elected as follows:

Presidential elections 2nd round 

In the second round of the French presidential elections of 2017 Aisne was one of only two departments (along nearby Pas-de-Calais) in which the candidate of the Front National, Marine Le Pen, received a majority of the votes cast: 52.91%. In the second round of the 2022 French presidential election, Aisne was the mainland departement with the highest percentage support for her.

Representatives in the National Assembly

Administration
Aisne is divided into five arrondissements and 21 cantons. The department has 798 communes and five parliamentary constituencies.

Demography

Aisne lost some of its population in the second half of the 19th century, due to the rural exodus but this was limited by the industrial development in the north of the department (Saint-Quentin, Chaunois, Thiérache).

Greatly affected by the First World War, the department has seen its population grow slightly to the same level as in 1900. For thirty years, the industrial decline has caused stagnation of the population (526,346 in 1968, 535,489 in 1999). Only the south-west of the department, close to the Paris conurbation, has seen much population growth.

Population development since 1791:

Tourism

The boat tours relates in part to the Canal de Saint-Quentin with its electric towage and two tunnels (Lesdins and Riqueval/Vendhuile).

In 2007, a large infrastructure for tourist accommodation, the Center Parcs, was built on the Lake of Ailette, close to many tourist attractions such as the Cathedral of Laon, the Chemin des Dames and the Château de Coucy.

Among the many places to explore are:

 Monuments
 Castle of Villers-Cotterets at Château-Thierry
 Château de Condé
 Château de Coucy
 Castle Oigny-en-Valois
 Dungeon of Septmonts
 Château of Guise

 Cathedrals
 Cathédrale Notre-Dame de Laon
 Soissons Cathedral

 Churches and abbeys
 Saint-Michel-en-Thiérache Abbey
 Abbaye du Tortoir de Saint Nicolas aux Bois
 Abbaye Saint-Vincent de Laon
 Abbaye Saint-Martin de Laon
 Longpont Abbey
 Abbey of St. Jean des Vignes
 Vauclair Abbey
 Church of Saint-Caprais
 Abbey church of Saint-Yved de Braine

 War memorials of the First World War
 Chemin des Dames
 The Caverne of the Dragon
 The Landowski Ghosts, Margival
 Bois de Belleau/Bois de la Brigade de Marine

 Musées
 Musée Henri Matisse à Bohain-en-Vermandois
 Quentin de Latour Museum in Saint-Quentin
 Musée du cheminot, the Familistère de Godin at Guise.

In 2019, the department had 3.5% of second homes.

Culture 
During World War I a number of significant architectural monuments were destroyed. Of the buildings that survived, the medieval churches in Laon, Braine, and Urcel are the most significant. The ruined castle of La Ferté-Milon escaped further damage during the war. Of the castles that survived, some were used as prisons, such as the Castle of Vadancourt, near Saint-Quentin (500 prisoners).

It is thought that the Aisne River was the birthplace of the trench warfare seen in the First World War. The British Expeditionary Force (BEF) had initial early successes driving the Germans back to the Aisne River; the German troops dug in and managed to hold out against both British and French attacks. This German entrenchment was to mould the entire face of World War One as both sides began digging in and fortifying their positions. Thus began the stalemate that became a significant feature of the First World War.

Languages
 Picard in the north
 Champenois dialect in the south
 the French of Île-de-France in the centre and the south.

This linguistic variance probably explains the difficulty for residents south of Aisne to identify themselves as belonging to the Picardy region.

Gastronomy
 Rustic cuisine. The north of the department is a farming area and there are products made from cow's milk such as Maroilles cheese and Dulce de leche. There are also typically Picardy specialties such as "ficelle", a sort of rolled crêpe with cream cheese, béchamel, ham, and mushrooms. Foie gras is a product developed in Thiérache of the highest quality.
 The cultivation of red fruit (strawberries) is beginning to develop.
 Trade shows for: cheeses (La Capelle), blood sausage (Saint-Quentin).
 Tastings in flea markets and many opportunities to discover local products in a traditional atmosphere.
 In the south there are kidney beans form Soissons and the Tourist route of Champagne where some champagnes produced in the Chateau-Thierry region, like the maroilles, are recognized by the Appellation d'origine contrôlée (AOC).
 Thiérache cider and its eau-de-vie and the production of beer (mostly craft) give the department of Aisne real identity.
 Large swarms of bees mean that the flavours of honey, mead, gingerbread, vinegar etc. can be found.

Notable people linked to the department
 Camille Desmoulins ((1760–1794)), revolutionary politician and journalist, was from Guise
Achille Jacopin is a sculptor born in 1874 and died in 1958 at Château-Thierry
 Paul and Camille Claudel came from Tardenois
 Jean de la Fontaine was from Château-Thierry
 Paul Doumer, French president from 1931 to 1932, founder of the journal La tribune de l'Aisne and long time deputy for the departement
 Alexandre Dumas was from Villers-Cotterets
 The fictional character Jean Valjean was born in Faverolles, Aisne
 Jean Racine was from La Ferte-Milon
 Maurice Quentin de la Tour was born in Saint-Quentin
 Louis Antoine de Saint-Just ((1767–1794)), revolutionary politician and member of the Committee of Public Safety, was from Blérancourt
 François-Noël Babeuf, called Gracchus Babeuf (1760–1797) was from Saint Quentin
 Guillaume-Benoît Houdet, lawyer, MP, and Mayor of Château-Thierry (1800–1805)
 Henri Matisse, painter, spent his childhood in Bohain-en-Vermandois
 Sébastien Cauet, host-producer of television and radio French, is from Marle
 Jean-Baptiste André Godin (1817–1888), an industrialist and French philanthropist, creator of Familistère de Guise
 Nicolas de Condorcet (1743–1794), a philosopher, mathematician and political scientist was from Ribemont
 Leo Lemoine, mayor of Saulchery member of the Resistance in February 1941 and died for France in exile at Buchenwald Dora with his son Jacques (17 years old)
 Kamini, a rapper, is from Le Nouvion-en-Thiérache

See also
 Cantons of the Aisne department
 Communes of the Aisne department
 Arrondissements of the Aisne department

References

External links

  Prefecture website
  Departmental Council website
  Set up your business in Aisne
  Chamber of Commerce and Industry of Aisne
  Chamber of Trades of Aisne
  Aisne Chamber of Agriculture
  Aisne Development Agency
  Official Tourist Board
 Dmoz 
 Département de l’Aisne The Accounts of the Communes in fiscal groupings—Individual data for budget, consolidated data for the "Principle Budget and budget annexes"

 
1790 establishments in France
Departments of Hauts-de-France
States and territories established in 1790